Omiodes pseudocuniculalis is a moth in the family Crambidae. It was described by Patricia Gentili-Poole and Maria Alma Solis in 2000. It is found in Ecuador (Loja Province), Peru and Bolivia.

References

Moths described in 2000
pseudocuniculalis